Jean Paul Pierre Casimir-Perier (8 November 1847 – 11 March 1907) was a French politician who served as President of France from 1894 to 1895.

Biography
He was born in Paris, the son of Auguste Casimir-Perier, the grandson of Casimir Pierre Perier, premier of Louis Philippe, and the great grandson of Claude Périer, one of the founders of the Bank of France. He entered public life as secretary to his father, who was Minister of the Interior under the presidency of Thiers.

In 1874 he was elected General Councillor of the Aube département, and was sent by the same département to the Chamber of Deputies in the general elections of 1876, and he was always re-elected until his presidency. In spite of the traditions of his family, Casimir-Perier joined the group of Republicans on the Left, and was one of the 363 on the Seize-Mai (1877). He refused to vote the "expulsion of the Princes" in 1883, and resigned as Deputy upon the enactment of the law (26 June 1886) because of his personal connections with the family of Orléans.

On 17 August 1883 he became Under-Secretary of State for War, a post he retained until 7 January 1885. From 1890 to 1892 he was Vice President of the Chamber, then in 1893 President. On 3 December he became President of the council, holding the department of Foreign Affairs, resigned in May 1894, and was re-elected President of the Chamber.

On 24 June 1894, after the assassination of President Carnot, he was elected President of the Republic by 451 votes against 195 for Henri Brisson and 97 for Charles Dupuy. His presidency lasted only six months. The resignation of the Dupuy ministry on 14 January 1895 was followed the next day by that of the President. Casimir-Perier explained his action by the fact that he found himself ignored by the ministers, who did not consult him before taking decisions, and did not keep him informed upon political events, especially in foreign affairs.

Perier died on 11 March 1907 in Paris of Angina pectoris.

As of 2021, of all Presidents of France through its history, Casimir-Perier had the shortest presidency.

From that time he completely abandoned politics, and devoted himself to business – especially mining. At the trial of Alfred Dreyfus at Rennes, Casimir-Perier's evidence, as opposed to that of General Mercier, was of great value to the cause of Dreyfus.

Casimir-Perier's Ministry, 3 December 1893 – 30 May 1894
Jean Casimir-Perier – President of the Council and Minister of Foreign Affairs
Auguste Mercier – Minister of War
David Raynal – Minister of the Interior
Auguste Burdeau – Minister of Finance
Antonin Dubost – Minister of Justice
Jean Marty – Minister of Commerce, Industry, and Colonies
Auguste Alfred Lefèvre – Minister of Marine
Eugène Spuller – Minister of Public Instruction, Fine Arts, and Worship
Albert Viger – Minister of Agriculture
Charles Jonnart – Minister of Public Works

Changes
20 March 1894 – Jean Marty becomes Minister of Posts and Telegraphs as well as Minister of Commerce and Industry.  Ernest Boulanger succeeds Marty as Minister of Colonies.

References

External links

 
 

 
 
 
 

 
 

 
 

1847 births
1907 deaths
Politicians from Paris
French republicans
19th-century presidents of France
19th-century Princes of Andorra
Prime Ministers of France
French Foreign Ministers
Presidents of the Chamber of Deputies (France)
Members of the 1st Chamber of Deputies of the French Third Republic
Members of the 2nd Chamber of Deputies of the French Third Republic
Members of the 3rd Chamber of Deputies of the French Third Republic
Members of the 4th Chamber of Deputies of the French Third Republic
Members of the 5th Chamber of Deputies of the French Third Republic
Members of the 6th Chamber of Deputies of the French Third Republic
People associated with the Dreyfus affair
Deaths from angina pectoris